Kylie Bisutti (born March 31, 1990 in Jackpot, Nevada) is an American author and former model who won the 2009 "Victoria's Secret Model Search" competition, broadcast online through CBS and concluded during the December 1st airing of that year's Fashion Show.  She soon quit modeling lingerie due to it conflicting with her Christian values and in 2013 published a memoir, I'm No Angel: From Victoria's Secret Model to Role Model. She followed that with a daily devotional book for young women, and later started a Christian clothing line with her aunt called God Inspired Fashion.

Personal life
Bisutti (née Ludlow) was born in Jackpot, Nevada and grew up in Las Vegas, Nevada.  At 15, she was invited by a friend from high school to a church youth group party, and after learning more about Christianity, became a Christian herself.

For her 18th birthday, her parents took her on along on her father's company retreat to Mexico, where she met her father's co-worker, Mike Bisutti, whom she began dating and later married in Cabo San Lucas in 2009.  They now live in Montana. On January 21, 2014, they welcomed their first child, a boy named Jase Michael Bisutti. They have since welcomed two more sons: Luca Bisutti, born July 26, 2015, and Seth Michael Bisutti, born March 23, 2017. Her fourth child, daughter Juliyanna Grace, was born on January 24, 2019.

Career
Bisutti aspired to be a Victoria's Secret model from a young age, and recalls being told by friends and strangers to become a model. She won her first casting call at age eight and began modeling regularly at the Fashion Show Mall in Las Vegas.  At 16, she moved to New York City to pursue modeling full-time. She lived with four other models in an apartment. She says she stayed away from alcohol and clubs.

Following her marriage, her husband's stepmom saw a flier for the 2009 "Victoria's Secret Model Search" competition and she decided to enter. She went to the audition in Los Angeles, where Victoria's Secret executive Ed Razek called her runway walk one of the best he had ever seen. Shortly after the audition, she was named to the top 10 to compete in the televised contest, and later became one of the two finalists along with Jamie Lee Darley.  She was voted the winner of the competition and walked the runway at the 2009 Victoria's Secret Fashion Show in a bra and panties, feeling "on top of the world".

Bisutti later wrote for The New York Post of her Victoria's Secret Fashion Show walk, "[E]ven though I was only 19, a newlywed and growing in my relationship to God, I didn’t think twice about strutting my stuff in skimpy bikinis and underwear in the TV contest."  She went on to claim that during the competition she was pushed to play down her marriage, because she was "supposed to be flirting with everyone all the time" and that married models were told to keep quiet about their marriages unless they were married to a celebrity because it drew more attention to the brand. She later modeled for FHM and Maxim.

In May 2013, Bisutti released her memoir I'm No Angel: From Victoria's Secret Model to Role Model, describing her life and detailing how, after the show, she became disillusioned with modeling due to the provocative nature of the work, developing body image issues, and negative experiences with photographers.  She claimed she went through "unhealthy" things to book jobs, such as crash and starvation diets, saying those behaviors are common practice among models. She said, "For little girls looking in, it's really not good for them to see those things."  Bisutti decided to quit modeling, a decision her husband supported.  She tweeted "I quit being a VS model to be a Proverbs 31 wife."

Prior to the book's release, Victoria's Secret released a statement claiming Bisutti had made "numerous fabrications and misstatements…She was never a Victoria's Secret 'Angel' as defined by the terms of our Angel model contract.  And contrary to Ms. Bisutti's claims, she was never offered any subsequent modeling contracts or opportunities with Victoria's Secret despite her multiple appeals for further work."  Bisutti responded in an interview: "All the truth is in the book. … My book is really not about Victoria's Secret. It's about the modeling industry as a whole and about helping girls with self-body image issues, eating disorders and really exposing the entire industry for what it is. It's not targeting their brand." Bisutti said that initially legal issues were considered but after having read the book, the company "realized there were no grounds for the statements they came out with".

In 2014, Tyndale House published Bisutti's 30 Days to a More Beautiful You, a Christian devotional for young women.

Bisutti and her aunt started a Christian clothing line for men, women and children that features inspirational sayings, Bible verses and artwork called God Inspired Fashion. She said "With all of the bullying that goes on nowadays, I really wanted to have clothing that focused on uplifting kids and verses that would maybe put a smile on someone’s face if they were having a bad day". She also wanted the clothing to be positive and provoke questions and conversations between students. The clothing line as of 2018 is only available in the United States, but Bisutti said she has had requests from Europe, Mexico, and Canada. She also said that the only group that hadn't given positive feedback is atheists: "They are really against the children's line, and having Bible verses on children's clothing." The line differs from other Christian clothing in that items like collared shirts, vests, jackets, jeans and more are included, instead of the typical t-shirts with logos presented by other vendors.

References

External links
Official website
Official company website
Victoria's Secret Fashion Show 2009 - Kylie's Journey (Official CBS YouTube page)

1990 births
Living people
21st-century American women writers
21st-century Christians
American Christian writers
21st-century American memoirists
Christians from California
Female models from California
Green Valley High School (Nevada) alumni
People from Simi Valley, California
American women memoirists
Writers from California
Christians from Nevada